Notable alumni of the J. Reuben Clark Law School at Brigham Young University (BYU).

Federal judges

U.S. circuit judges
 Jay S. Bybee, class of 1980, Court of Appeals for the Ninth Circuit (2003–present) 
 Ryan D. Nelson. class of 1999, Court of Appeals for the Ninth Circuit (2018–present)
 N. Randy Smith, class of 1977, Court of Appeals for the Ninth Circuit (2007–present)

U.S. district judges
 Dee Benson, class of 1976, District of Utah, United States Court (1991–2020), Foreign Intelligence Surveillance Court (2004–2020) 
 Michael W. Mosman, class of 1984, District of Oregon, United States Court (2003–present), Foreign Intelligence Surveillance Court (2013–2020)
 David Nuffer, class of 1978, District of Utah, United States Court (1995–present) 
 David Nye, class of 1986, District of Idaho, United States Court (2017–present)
 G. Murray Snow, class of 1984, District of Arizona, United States Court (2008–present)

State judges

Supreme court justices
 G. Richard Bevan, class of 1987, Idaho Supreme Court (2017–present)
 Gregory W. Moeller, class of 1990, Idaho Supreme Court (2018–present)

Court of appeals judges
 John D. Luthy, class of 2000, Utah Court of Appeals (2022-present)
 David Mortensen, class of 1993, Utah Court of Appeals (2016–present)
 Stephen L. Roth, class of 1977, Utah Court of Appeals (2010–2017)
 J. Frederic Voros, Jr., class of 1978, Utah Court of Appeals (2009–2017)

Politicians

Federal Executive Branch
Kathleen Clarke, Director, United States Bureau of Land Management (2001–2006)
David C. Fischer, class of 1973, Commissioner, Joint US and Canada International Boundary Commission (1985–1991)

United States attorneys
Dee Benson, class of 1976, District of Utah (1989–1991) 
Michael W. Mosman, class of 1984, District of Oregon (2001–2003)
Monte N. Stewart, class of 1976, District of Nevada (1992–1993)
Brett Tolman, class of 1998, District of Utah (2006–2009) 
Paul Warner, class of 1976, District of Utah (1998–2005)

State executive branch
Becky Harris, class of 1992, Chairwoman, Nevada Gaming Control Board (2017–2018); Nevada State Senator (2014–2017)
Mark Hutchison, class of 1990, Lieutenant Governor of Nevada (2015–2019); Nevada State Senator (2013–2014)
Rory Reid, class of 1988, Chairman, Clark County Commission (2003–2011); Chairman, Nevada Democratic Party (1999)

Legislative branch

United States Senate
 Mike Lee, class of 1997, United States Senator (R) from Utah (2011–present)

United States House of Representatives
 Chris Cannon, class of 1980, United States Congressman (R) from Utah (3rd District) (1997–2009) 
 Enid Greene Mickelsen, class of 1983, United States Congresswoman (R) from Utah (2nd District) (1995–1997)
 William H. Orton, class of 1979, United States Congressman (D) from Utah (3rd District) (1991–1997)

Academia
 Henry J. Eyring, class of 1989, 17th President, Brigham Young University-Idaho (2017–present); Director, Marriott School of Business MBA Program (1998–2002)
 Rodney K. Smith, class of 1977, 6th President, Southern Virginia University (2004–2011); Dean, Alexander Blewett III School of Law (1993-1995)
 Kevin J Worthen, class of 1982, 13th President, Brigham Young University (2014–present); Dean, J. Reuben Clark Law School (2004–2008)

Business leaders
 Joseph A. Cannon, class of 1977, CEO of Fuel Freedom Foundation; Managing Editor, Deseret Morning News (2007–2010); Chairman, Utah Republican Party (2002–2006)
 Steven J. Lund, class of 1983, Founder and CEO of Nu Skin Enterprises; CEO of Nu Skin
 Clate Mask, class of 2000, CEO of Infusionsoft; NY Times Best Selling Author

Ecclesiastical leaders
 David F. Evans, class of 1979, First Quorum of the Seventy
 Von G. Keetch, class of 1987, First Quorum of the Seventy; former chief outside counsel for the Church of Jesus Christ of Latter-day Saints (LDS Church)
 Denise Posse-Blanco Lindberg, class of 1988, Judge for Third Judicial District, Utah (1998–2014); General Young Women Board (2014–2018)
 Steven E. Snow, class of 1977, Church Historian and Recorder (2012–2019); Presidency of the Seventy (2007–2012); White House Office of Faith-Based and Neighborhood Partnerships Appointee

Other alumni
 James W. Parkinson, class of 1976, activist for reparations for American slave laborers for private Japanese companies during WWII and successful litigator against big tobacco
 Christy Goldsmith Romero, Special Inspector General of the Troubled Asset Relief Program
 Hannah Clayson Smith, class of 2001, Senior Counsel for Becket Fund for Religious Liberty
 Karl Tilleman, class of 1990, Canadian Olympian; NBA draft pick; Area Seventy
 Richard E. Turley, Jr., class of 1985, Managing Director of Public Affairs for the LDS Church (2016–2020); Assistant Church Historian (2008–2016); President of the Genealogical Society of Utah (2000–2008)
 Steve Young, class of 1994, Pro Football Hall of Fame quarterback; ESPN football analyst; Managing Director of HGGC

References

List